Electoral systems are the rules for conducting elections, a main component of which is the algorithm for determining the winner (or several winners) from the ballots cast. This article discusses methods and results of comparing different electoral systems, both those that elect a unique candidate in a 'single-winner' election and those that elect a group of representatives in a multiwinner election.

Various electoral systems can be judged using expert opinions, pragmatic considerations and candidacy effects.

As well, there are 4 main types of reasoning that have been used to try to determine the best voting method:
 Results of simulated elections
 Adherence to logical criteria
 Results of real elections
 Argument by example.

Systems can be by judged according to advantages or disadvantages of different ballot formats or district formats, whether single-member districts or multi-member districts.

Expert opinions on single-winner voting methods
In 2010, a panel of 22 experts on voting procedures were asked: "What is the best voting rule for your town to use to elect the mayor?". One member abstained. Approval voting was used to decide between 18 single-winner voting methods. The ranking (with number N of approvers from a maximum of 21) of the various systems was as follows.

Note: this list is not representative of all available single-winner voting methods, and several of the experts involved later noted flaws in the way that the poll was conducted. The organizer of the poll argues that the results should not be generalized, referring to it as a "naive vote on voting rules".

Pragmatic considerations
One intellectual problem posed by voting theory is that of devising systems that are accurate in some sense. However, there are also practical reasons why one system may be more socially acceptable than another.

The important factors can be grouped under 3 headings:
 Intelligibility, which Tideman defines as "the capacity of the rule to gain the trust of voters" and "depends on the reasonableness and understandability of the logic of the rule".
 Ease of voting. Different forms of ballot make it more or less difficult for voters to fill in ballot papers fairly reflecting their views.
 Ease of counting. Voting systems that make their decisions from a small set of counts derived from ballots are logistically less burdensome than those that need to consult the entire set of ballots. Some voting systems require powerful computational resources to determine the winner. Even if the cost is not prohibitive for electoral use, it may preclude effective evaluation.

Candidacy effects
A separate topic is the fact that different candidates may be encouraged to run for election under different voting systems. The fear of wasted votes under FPTP puts a lot of power in the hands of the groups who select candidates. A different voting system might lead to more satisfactory decisions without necessarily being fairer in any abstract sense. This topic has received little analytic study.

A Canadian example of this is the 2018 London, Ontario municipal election. In 2018, in Ward 13, Arielle Kayabaga won. Her success is credited to the Instant-Runoff Voting system that had just previously replaced the city First past the post system but actually she would have been the winner under First past the post anyway. IRV can claim credit for her success as she has said she would not have run if not for IRV replacing the FPTP.

Evaluation by simulation

Models of the electoral process
Voting methods can be evaluated by measuring their accuracy under random simulated elections aiming to be faithful to the properties of elections in real life. The first such evaluation was conducted by Chamberlin and Cohen in 1978, who measured the frequency with which certain non-Condorcet systems elected Condorcet winners. There are three main types of model which have been proposed as representations of the electoral process, two of which can be combined in a hybrid. A fourth type of model, the utilitarian model, is of conceptual significance in spite of not being used in practice, though spatial models are sometimes presented in utilitarian guise.

Condorcet's jury model
The Marquis de Condorcet viewed an election as analogous to a jury vote in which each member expresses an independent judgement on the quality of candidates. On this account the candidates differ in objective merit and the electors express independent views of the relative merits of the candidates. So long as the voters' judgements are better than random, a sufficiently large electorate will always choose the best candidate. A jury model is sometimes known as a valence model.

The jury model implies a natural concept of accuracy for voting systems: the likelier a system is to elect the best candidate, the better the system. This may be seen as providing a semantics for electoral decisions.

Condorcet and his contemporary Laplace realised that voting theory could thus be reduced to probability theory – Condorcet's main work was titled Essai sur l'application de l'analyse à la probabilité des décisions rendues à la pluralité des voix. Their ideas were revived in the twentieth century when it was shown under a jury model that the Kemeny-Young voting method  is  the maximum likelihood estimator of the ordering of candidates by merit.

Black's spatial model
The main weakness of Condorcet's model is its assumption of independence: it implies that there can be no tendency for voters who prefer A to B to also prefer C to D. This flies in the face of evidence: someone who prefers a certain montagnard  to a certain girondin will probably also prefer a second montagnard  to a second girondin; it also explains why even arbitrarily large juries are fallible, since members will make common mistakes.

Duncan Black proposed a one-dimensional spatial model of voting in 1948, viewing elections as ideologically driven. His ideas were later expanded by Anthony Downs. Voters' opinions are regarded as positions in a space of one or more dimensions; candidates have positions in the same space; and voters choose candidates in order of proximity (measured under Euclidean distance or some other metric).

Spatial models imply a different notion of merit for voting systems: the more acceptable the winning candidate may be as a location parameter for the voter distribution, the better the system. A political spectrum is a one-dimensional spatial model.

Arrow's neutral model
Kenneth Arrow worked within a framework in which the ballots are the ultimate reality rather than being 'messages' (as Balinski and Laraki put it ) conveying partial (and possibly misleading) information about some reality behind them. He did not propose this agnosticism as a realistic picture of voting, but rather as defining elections as mathematical objects whose properties could be investigated. His famous Impossibility theorem shows (under certain assumptions) that for any ranked voting system, there exist sets of ballots (obtainable under a neutral model) which violate at least one of three criteria often considered to be desirable.

A neutral model does not bring with it any concept of accuracy or truth for voting systems.

Impartial culture models define distributions of ballots cast under a neutral voting model, treating the electorate as a random noise source.

Hybrid models
It is possible to combine jury models with spatial models: it can be assumed that voters are influenced partly by their views of the qualities of candidates and partly by ideological considerations. This breaks their preferences down into separate independent and non-independent components. Hybrid models are discussed briefly by Darlington but have not been widely adopted.

Empirical comparison
Tideman and Plassmann conducted a study which showed that a two-dimensional spatial model gave a reasonable fit to 3-candidate reductions of a large set of electoral rankings. Jury and neutral models and one-dimensional spatial models were shown to be inadequate but hybrid models were not considered.

They looked at Condorcet cycles in voter preferences (an example of which is A being preferred to B by a majority of voters, B to C and C to A) and found that the number of them was consistent with small-sample effects, concluding that "voting cycles will occur very rarely, if at all, in elections with many voters".

The relevance of sample size had been studied previously by Gordon Tullock, who argued graphically that although finite electorates will always be prone to cycles, the area in which candidates may give rise to cycling becomes progressively smaller as the number of voters increases.

Utilitarian models
A utilitarian model views voters as ranking candidates in order of utility. The rightful winner, under this model, is the candidate who maximises overall social utility. A utilitarian model differs from a spatial model in several important ways:
 It requires the additional assumption that voters are motivated solely by informed self-interest, with no ideological taint to their preferences.
 It requires the distance metric of a spatial model to be replaced by a faithful measure of utility.
 Consequently the metric will need to differ between voters. It often happens that one group of voters will be powerfully affected by the choice between two candidates while another group has little at stake; the metric will then need to be highly asymmetric.
It follows from the last property that no voting system which gives equal influence to all voters is likely to achieve maximum social utility. Extreme cases of conflict between the claims of utilitarianism and democracy are referred to as the 'tyranny of the majority'. See Laslier's, Merlin's and Nurmi's comments in Laslier's write-up.

James Mill seems to have been the first to claim the existence of an a priori connection between democracy and utilitarianism – see the Stanford Encyclopedia article  and Macaulay's 'famous attack'.

Comparisons under a jury model
Suppose that the i th  candidate in an election has merit xi (we may assume that xi ~ N (0,σ2)), and that voter j 's level of approval for candidate i may be written as xi + εij (we will assume that the εij are iid. N (0,τ2)). We assume that a voter ranks candidates in decreasing order of approval. We may interpret εij as the error in voter j 's valuation of candidate i and regard a voting method as having the task of finding the candidate of greatest merit.

Condorcet's jury theorem shows that so long as p > , the majority vote of a jury will be a better guide to the relative merits of two candidates than is the opinion of any single member.

Peyton Young showed that three further properties apply to votes between arbitrary numbers of candidates, suggesting that Condorcet was aware of the first and third of them.
 if p is close to 1, then the Minimax winner is the maximum likelihood estimator of the best candidate.
 For any p, the Kemeny-Young ranking is the maximum likelihood estimator of the true order of merit.

Robert F. Bordley constructed a 'utilitarian' model which is a slight variant of Condorcet's jury model. He viewed the task of a voting method as that of finding the candidate who has the greatest total approval from the electorate, i.e. the highest sum of individual voters' levels of approval. This model makes sense even with σ2 = 0, in which case p takes the value  where n is the number of voters. He performed an evaluation under this model, finding as expected that the Borda count was most accurate.

Simulated elections under spatial models
A simulated election can be constructed from a distribution of voters in a suitable space. The illustration shows voters satisfying a bivariate Gaussian distribution centred on O. There are 3 randomly generated candidates, A, B and C. The space is divided into 6 segments by 3 lines, with the voters in each segment having the same candidate preferences. The proportion of voters ordering the candidates in any way is given by the integral of the voter distribution over the associated segment.

The proportions corresponding to the 6 possible orderings of candidates determine the results yielded by different voting systems. Those which elect the best candidate, i.e. the candidate closest to O (who in this case is A), are considered to have given a correct result, and those which elect someone else have exhibited an error. By looking at results for large numbers of randomly generated candidates the empirical properties of voting systems can be measured.

The evaluation protocol outlined here is modelled on the one described by Tideman and Plassmann.
Evaluations of this type are commonest for single-winner electoral systems. Ranked voting systems fit most naturally into the framework, but other types of ballot (such a FPTP and Approval voting) can be accommodated with lesser or greater effort.

The evaluation protocol can be varied in a number of ways:
 The number of voters can be made finite and varied in size. In practice this is almost always done in multivariate models, with voters being sampled from their distribution and results for large electorates being used to show limiting behaviour.
 The number of candidates can be varied.
 The voter distribution could be varied; for instance, the effect of asymmetric distributions could be examined. A minor departure from normality is entailed by random sampling effects when the number of voters is finite. More systematic departures (seemingly taking the form of a Gaussian mixture model) were investigated by Jameson Quinn in 2017.

Evaluation for accuracy

One of the main uses of evaluations is to compare the accuracy of voting systems when voters vote sincerely. If an infinite number of voters satisfy a Gaussian distribution, then the rightful winner of an election can be taken to be the candidate closest to the mean/median, and the accuracy of a method can be identified with the proportion of elections in which the rightful winner is elected. The median voter theorem guarantees that all Condorcet systems will give 100% accuracy (and the same applies to Coombs' method).

Evaluations published in research papers use multidimensional Gaussians, making the calculation numerically difficult. The number of voters is kept finite and the number of candidates is necessarily small.

The computation is much more straightforward in a single dimension, which allows an infinite number of voters and an arbitrary number m of candidates. Results for this simple case are shown in the first table, which is directly comparable with Table 5 (1000 voters, medium dispersion) of the cited paper by Chamberlin and Cohen. The candidates were sampled randomly from the voter distribution and a single Condorcet method (Minimax) was included in the trials for confirmation.

The relatively poor performance of the Alternative vote (IRV) is explained by the well known and common source of error illustrated by the diagram, in which the election satisfies  a univariate spatial model and the rightful winner B will be eliminated in the first round. A similar problem exists in all dimensions.

An alternative measure of accuracy is the average distance of voters from the winner (in which smaller means better). This is unlikely to change the ranking of voting methods, but is preferred by people who interpret distance as disutility. The second table shows the average distance (in standard deviations) minus  (which is the average distance of a variate from the centre of a standard Gaussian distribution) for 10 candidates under the same model.

Evaluation for resistance to tactical voting
James Green-Armytage et al. published a study in which they assessed the vulnerability of several voting systems to manipulation by voters. They say little about how they adapted their evaluation for this purpose, mentioning simply that it 'requires creative programming'. An earlier paper by the first author gives a little more detail.

The number of candidates in their simulated elections was limited to 3. This removes the distinction between certain systems; for instance Black's method and the Dasgupta-Maskin method are equivalent on 3 candidates.

The conclusions from the study are hard to summarise, but the Borda count performed badly; Minimax was somewhat vulnerable; and IRV was highly resistant. The authors showed that limiting any method to elections with no Condorcet winner (choosing the Condorcet winner when there was one) would never increase its susceptibility to tactical voting. They reported that the 'Condorcet-Hare' system which uses IRV as a tie-break for elections not resolved by the Condorcet criterion was as resistant to tactical voting as IRV on its own and more accurate. Condorcet-Hare is equivalent to Copeland's method with an IRV tie-break in elections with 3 candidates.

Evaluation for the effect of the candidate distribution

Some systems, and the Borda count in particular, are vulnerable when the distribution of candidates is displaced relative to the distribution of voters. The attached table shows the accuracy of the Borda count (as a percentage) when an infinite population of voters satisfies a univariate Gaussian distribution and m candidates are drawn from a similar distribution offset by x standard distributions. Red colouring indicates figures which are worse than random. Recall that all Condorcet methods give 100% accuracy for this problem. (And notice that the reduction in accuracy as x increases is not seen when there are only 3 candidates.)

Sensitivity to the distribution of candidates can be thought of as a matter either of accuracy or of resistance to manipulation. If one expects that in the course of things candidates will naturally come from the same distribution as voters, then any displacement will be seen as attempted subversion; but if one thinks that factors determining the viability of candidacy (such as financial backing) may be correlated with ideological position, then one will view it more in terms of accuracy.

Published evaluations take different views of the candidate distribution. Some simply assume that candidates are drawn from the same distribution as voters. Several older papers assume equal means but allow the candidate distribution to be more or less tight than the voter distribution. A paper by Tideman and Plassmann approximates the relationship between candidate and voter distributions based on empirical measurements. This is less realistic than it may appear, since it makes no allowance for the candidate distribution to adjust to exploit any weakness in the voting system. A paper by James Green-Armytage looks at the candidate distribution as a separate issue, viewing it as a form of manipulation and measuring the effects of strategic entry and exit. Unsurprisingly he finds the Borda count to be particularly vulnerable.

Evaluation for other properties
 As previously mentioned, Chamberlin and Cohen measured the frequency with which certain non-Condorcet systems elect Condorcet winners. Under a spatial model with equal voter and candidate distributions the frequencies are 99% (Coombs), 86% (Borda), 60% (IRV) and 33% (FPTP). This is sometimes known as Condorcet efficiency.
 Darlington measured the frequency with which Copeland's method produces a unique winner in elections with no Condorcet winner. He found it to be less than 50% for fields of up to 10 candidates.

Experimental metrics
The task of a voting system under a spatial model is to identify the candidate whose position most accurately represents the distribution of voter opinions. This amounts to choosing a location parameter for the distribution from the set of alternatives offered by the candidates. Location parameters may be based on the mean, the median, or the mode; but since ranked preference ballots provide only ordinal information, the median is the only acceptable statistic.

This can be seen from the diagram, which illustrates two simulated elections with the same candidates but different voter distributions. In both cases the mid-point between the candidates is the 51st percentile of the voter distribution; hence 51% of voters prefer A and 49% prefer B. If we consider a voting method to be correct if it elects the candidate closest to the median of the voter population, then since the median is necessarily slightly to the left of the 51% line, a voting method will be considered to be correct if it elects A in each case.

The mean of the teal distribution is also slightly to the left of the 51% line, but the mean of the orange distribution is slightly to the right. Hence if we consider a voting method to be correct if it elects the candidate closest to the mean of the voter population, then a method will not be able to obtain full marks unless it produces different winners from the same ballots in the two elections. Clearly this will impute  spurious errors to voting methods. The same problem will arise for any cardinal measure of location; only the median gives consistent results.

The median is not defined for multivariate distributions but the univariate median has a property which generalises conveniently. The median of a distribution is the position whose average distance from all points within the distribution is smallest. This definition generalises to the geometric median in multiple dimensions. The distance is sometimes described as a voter's 'disutility' from a candidate's election, but this identification is purely arbitrary.

If we have a set of candidates and a population of voters, then it is not necessary to solve the computationally difficult problem of finding the geometric median of the voters and then identify the candidate closest to it; instead we can identify the candidate whose average distance from the voters is minimised. This is the metric which has been generally deployed since Merrill onwards; see also Green-Armytage and Darlington.

The candidate closest to the geometric median of the voter distribution may be termed the 'spatial winner'.

Evaluation by real elections
Data from real elections can be analysed to compare the effects of different systems, either by comparing between countries or by applying alternative electoral systems to the real election data.

Opportunity for such appraisal arise when electoral systems are changed. 

A Canadian example of such an opportunity is seen in the City of Edmonton (Canada), which went from First-past-the-post voting in 1917 Alberta general election to five-member Plurality block voting in 1921 Alberta general election, to five-member Single transferable voting in 1926 Alberta general election, then to First-past-the-post voting again in 1959 Alberta general election. One party swept all the Edmonton seats in 1917, 1921 and 1959. Under STV in 1926, two Conservatives, one Liberal, one Labour and one United Farmers MLA were elected.

Argument by example

There is a long history of trying to prove the superiority of one voting method over another by constructing  examples in which the two methods give different answers, it being triumphantly asserted that the first method is right and the second wrong. Since examples can be constructed that are disadvantageous to all methods, this form of reasoning can be inconclusive. An instance occurs above where we illustrate a weakness in IRV by means of a fictitious election in which the rightful winner would be eliminated.

A noted recent instance has been given by Donald Saari. He reanalysed an example given by Condorcet of a hypothetical election between 3 candidates with 81 voters whose preferences are as shown in the first table. 

the initial count using just first preferences would be A 31, B 39, C 11

First past the post would elect B with 39 votes, less than half the votes.

IRV would see C eliminated in 2nd Stage, resulting in new count: A 41, B 40. Most would say that A, being the first or second choice of more voters than B, is the rightful winner.

The Condorcet winner is A, who is preferred to B by 41:40 and to C by 60:21; but the Borda winner is B. Condorcet concluded that the Borda count was at fault. Saari argues that the Borda count is right in this case, noting that the voters can be broken down into 3 groups as shown by the second table.

The pink and blue groups consist of clockwise and anticlockwise cycles which – according to Saari – cancel themselves out, leaving the result to be determined by the white group; and the clear preference of this group (again according to Saari) is for B.

The diagram shows a possible configuration of the voters and candidates consistent with the ballots, with everyone positioned on the circumference of a unit circle. It confirms Saari's judgement, in that A's distance from the average voter is 1.15 whereas B's is 1.09 (and C's is 1.70), making B the spatial winner. But it is only an example. We can imagine holding all positions fixed except for A's, and moving A radially towards the centre of the circle. An infinitesimal step is enough to make A the preference of the cyclical groups, though the white group continues to prefer B. Once A's distance from the centre is less than about 0.89 the overall preference flips from B to A, though the ballots cast would be unchanged.

Thus the election is ambiguous in that equally reasonable spatial representations imply different winners. This is the ambiguity we sought to avoid earlier by adopting a median metric for spatial models; but although the median metric achieves its aim in a single dimension, and generalises attractively to higher dimensions, the property needed to avoid ambiguity does not generalise. In general, cycles may make the spatial winner indeterminate without reference to external facts. The existence of an omnidirectional voter median is a sufficient condition to ensure a determinate result from the ballots cast, and in this case the spatial winner is the Condorcet winner; and unidimensionality of the voter distribution is sufficient for it to have an omnidirectional median.

Saari's example has been influential. Darlington recounts being told by a "reviewer for a very prestigious academic journal" that a similar example shows the Condorcet criterion to be "ridiculous, since a set of votes showing a tie shouldn't change an election's result".

Logical criteria for single-winner elections
Traditionally the merits of different electoral systems have been argued by reference to logical criteria. These have the form of rules of inference for electoral decisions, licensing the deduction, for instance, that "if E  and E ' are elections such that R (E,E '), and if A  is the rightful winner of E , then A  is the rightful winner of E ' ".

The criteria are as debatable as the voting systems themselves. Here we briefly discuss the considerations advanced concerning their validity, and then summarise the most important criteria, showing in a table which of the principal voting systems satisfy them.

Epistemology of voting criteria

Arguments from example
An example of misbehaviour in a voting system can be generalised to give a criterion that guarantees that no such fault can arise from a system satisfying the criterion, even in more complicated cases. Saari's example gives the Cancellation criterion (which is satisfied by the Borda count but violated by all Condorcet systems); the example illustrated of IRV eliminating the rightful winner can be generalised as the Condorcet criterion (which is violated by the Borda count).

A more interesting generalisation comes from the class of examples known as 'no-show paradoxes' which can be illustrated from the same diagram. Agreeing that B is the rightful winner, we can hypothesise that under a certain voting system B will indeed be elected if all voters vote sincerely, but that under this system, a single supporter of A can tilt the result towards his preferred candidate by simply abstaining. Most people would agree that this would be an absurd outcome. If we attached importance to it we could generalise it to the Participation criterion, which says that a voter can never help a candidate more by abstaining than by voting.

It is a large step from the example to the criterion. In the example the paradoxical result is simply wrong: B remains the rightful winner when a supporter of A abstains. But when we adopt the Participation criterion, we constrain electoral results in complicated examples in which it is impossible to identify the rightful winner, and with consequences which are hard to predict; this may be more than we bargained for.

The Participation criterion turns out to be surprisingly powerful: it rejects all Condorcet systems while accepting the Borda count. But the no-show paradoxes which arise from Condorcet systems are never examples in which the results are simply wrong, but rather cases in which pairs of results are related in an undesirable way without being determinately right or wrong.

Logical consistency
The widely accepted criteria are mutually inconsistent in various groups (the first of them being the group of 3 incompatible criteria identified by Arrow's impossibility theorem). They also contradict all voting systems. Dan Felsenthal described 16 criteria and 18 voting systems and showed "that every one of his 18 systems violates at least six of those criteria".

Result criteria (absolute) 
We now turn to the logical criteria themselves, starting with the absolute criteria which state that, if the set of ballots is a certain way, a certain candidate must or must not win.

 Majority criterion (MC)
 Will a candidate always win who is ranked as the unique favorite by a majority of voters? This criterion comes in two versions:
 Mutual majority criterion (MMC)
 Will a candidate always win who is among a group of candidates ranked above all others by a majority of voters?  This also implies the majority loser criterionif a majority of voters prefers every other candidate over a given candidate, then does that candidate not win? Therefore, of the methods listed, all pass neither or both criteria, except for Borda, which passes Majority Loser while failing Mutual Majority.
 Condorcet criterion
 Will a candidate always win who beats every other candidate in pairwise comparisons? (This implies the majority criterion, above.)
 Condorcet loser criterion (cond. loser)
 Will a candidate never win who loses to every other candidate in pairwise comparisons?

Result criteria (relative) 
These are criteria that state that, if a certain candidate wins in one circumstance, the same candidate must (or must not) win in a related circumstance.

Ballot-counting criteria 
These are criteria which relate to the process of counting votes and determining a winner.

Strategy criteria 
These are criteria that relate to a voter's incentive to use certain forms of strategy. They could also be considered as relative result criteria; however, unlike the criteria in that section, these criteria are directly relevant to voters; the fact that a method passes these criteria can simplify the process of figuring out one's optimal strategic vote.
Later-no-harm criterion, and later-no-help criterion
 Can voters be sure that adding a later preference to a ballot will not harm or help any candidate already listed?
No favorite betrayal (NFB)
 Can voters be sure that they do not need to rank any other candidate above their favorite in order to obtain a result they prefer?

Ballot format 

These are issues relating to the expressivity or information content of a valid ballot.
Ballot type
 What information is the voter given on the ballot?
Equal ranks
 Can a valid ballot express equal support for more than one candidate (and not just equal opposition to more than one)?
Over 2 ranks
 Can a ballot express more than two levels of support/opposition for different candidates?

Weakness 
Note on terminology: A criterion is said to be "weaker" than another when it is passed by more voting methods.  Frequently, this means that the conditions for the criterion to apply are stronger. For instance, the majority criterion (MC) is weaker than the multiple majority criterion (MMC), because it requires that a single candidate, rather than a group of any size, should win. That is, any method which passes the MMC also passes the MC, but not vice versa; while any required winner under the MC must win under the MMC, but not vice versa.

Compliance of selected single-winner methods 

The following table shows which of the above criteria are met by several single-winner methods.

This table is not comprehensive. For example, Coombs' method is not included.

Additional comparisons of voting criteria are available in the article on the Schulze method (a.k.a. beat path). Some data may be duplicated as these tables are work in progress.

Comparison of multi-winner systems
Multi-winner electoral systems at their best seek to produce assemblies representative in a broader sense than that of making the same decisions as would be made by single-winner votes. They can also be route to one-party sweeps of a city's seats, if a non-proportional system, such as Plurality block voting or ticket voting, is used.

The New Zealand Royal Commission on the Electoral System listed ten criteria for their evaluation of possible new electoral methods for New Zealand. These included fairness between political parties, effective representation of minority or special interest groups, political integration, effective voter participation and legitimacy.

Metrics for multi-winner evaluations
Evaluating the performance of multi-winner voting methods requires different metrics than are used for single-winner systems. The following have been proposed.
 Condorcet Committee Efficiency (CCE) measures the likelihood that a group of elected winners would beat all losers in pairwise races.
 Social-Utility Proportionality (SUP) measures the likelihood that each voter has at least one high-utility candidate among the winners.
 Egalitarian-Utility Proportionality (EUP) measures proportionality in terms of the voter with the lowest utility for the closest winning candidate.
 Centrist Tendency (CT) measures the likelihood of a method to elect candidates near the center or extremes of a political spectrum.
 Gallagher Index and Loosemore–Hanby index (LH) measure proportionality between seat share and party vote share. Gallagher generally uses overall voting party percentages or votes compared to seat percentages to assess proportionality so ignores presence of districts if any.
 Unrepresented vote measures the fraction of electorate not represented by any elected representative, votes that were not used to elect anyone.

Criterion tables

Compliance of party-based multi-winner methods

Compliance of non-majoritarian party-agnostic multi-winner methods 

The following table shows which of the above criteria are met by several multiple winner methods.

Compliance of majoritarian party-agnostic multi-winner methods 

The following table shows which of the above criteria are met by several multiple winner methods.

See also
 Ranked voting
 Arrow's impossibility theorem
 Cardinal utility and ordinal utility
 Condorcet paradox

Notes

References

Electoral system criteria